Julia Glushko was the defending champion, but chose not to participate.

Lizette Cabrera won the title, defeating Leylah Annie Fernandez in the final, 6–1, 6–4.

Seeds

Draw

Finals

Top half

Bottom half

References

External Links
Main Draw

Challenger Banque Nationale de Granby - Singles
Challenger de Granby